San José, also known as Pizote, is a district of the Upala canton, in the Alajuela province of Costa Rica.

Geography 
San José has an area of  km² and an elevation of  metres. Crossed by River Pizote.

Demographics 

For the 2011 census, San José had a population of  inhabitants.

Transportation

Road transportation 
The district is covered by the following road routes:
 National Route 4
 National Route 170
 National Route 732
 National Route 735

Economy 
Many products are harvested in this district, including beans, corn, rice, cattle, squash, taro, yam, cassava and plantains. It also has developed some tourism activities.

References 

Districts of Alajuela Province
Populated places in Alajuela Province